This article serves as an index - as complete as possible - of all the honorific orders or similar decorations received by the governors of Sarawak, classified by continent, awarding country and recipient.

State of Sarawak 

 Abang Haji Openg ( 1st List of Yang di-Pertua Negeri of Sarawak 16 September 1963 – death 28 March 1969 )
  Founding Grand Master of the Most Exalted Order of the Star of Sarawak (10 July 1964 – death 28 March 1969)
 Tuanku Bujang Tuanku Othman ( 2nd List of Yang di-Pertua Negeri of Sarawak 2 April 1969 – 2 April 1977 )
  Grand Master of the Most Exalted Order of the Star of Sarawak
  Founding Grand Master of the Order of the Star of Hornbill Sarawak (1970 - 2 April 1977)
  Founding Grand Master of the Most Exalted Order of the Star of Sarawak (1973 - 2 April 1977)
 Abang Muhammad Salahuddin ( 3rd & 6th List of Yang di-Pertua Negeri of Sarawak 2 April 1977 – 2 April 1981 & since 22 February 2001 )
  Grand Master of the Most Exalted Order of the Star of Sarawak
  Grand Master of the Order of the Star of Hornbill Sarawak
  Grand Master of the Most Exalted Order of the Star of Sarawak
 Abdul Rahman Ya'kub ( 4th List of Yang di-Pertua Negeri of Sarawak 2 April 1981 – 2 April 1985 )
  Grand Master of the Most Exalted Order of the Star of Sarawak (10 July 1964)
  Grand Master of the Order of the Star of Hornbill Sarawak (1970)
  Grand Master of the Order of Meritorious Service to Sarawak (1997)
  Grand Master of the Most Exalted Order of the Star of Sarawak (1973)
 Ahmad Zaidi Adruce ( 5th List of Yang di-Pertua Negeri of Sarawak 2 April 1985 – death 5 December 2000 )
  Grand Master of the Most Exalted Order of the Star of Sarawak
  Grand Master of the Order of the Star of Hornbill Sarawak
  Founding Grand Master of the Order of Meritorious Service to Sarawak (1997 – death 5 December 2000)
  Grand Master of the Most Exalted Order of the Star of Sarawak
 Abang Muhammad Salahuddin ( 3rd & 6th List of Yang di-Pertua Negeri of Sarawak 2 April 1977 – 2 April 1981 & since 22 February 2001 ) :
  Grand Master of the Most Exalted Order of the Star of Sarawak
  Order of the Star of Hornbill Sarawak : Grand Master and Knight Grand Commander (DP) with title Datuk Patinggi
  Grand Master of the Order of Meritorious Service to Sarawak
  Grand Master of the Most Exalted Order of the Star of Sarawak
 Pingat Cemerlang Delima (PCD)
 Norkiah, his wife :
  Order of the Star of Hornbill Sarawak : Grand Master and Knight Grand Commander (DP) with title Datuk Patinggi 
 Pingat Cemerlang Delima (PCD)

Malaysia, sultanates and states

Malaysia 

 Abang Muhammad Salahuddin ( 3rd & 6th List of Yang di-Pertua Negeri of Sarawak 2 April 1977 – 2 April 1981 & since 22 February 2001 ) :
  Grand Commander of the Order of the Defender of the Realm  (SMN) with title Tun

Sultanate of Perak 

 Abang Muhammad Salahuddin ( 3rd & 6th List of Yang di-Pertua Negeri of Sarawak 2 April 1977 – 2 April 1981 & since 22 February 2001 ) :
 "SPMP" which is either
  Knight Grand Commander of the Order of the Perak State Crown (SPMP) with title Dato' Sri
 or see Perlis

Sultanate of Perlis 

 Abang Muhammad Salahuddin ( 3rd & 6th List of Yang di-Pertua Negeri of Sarawak 2 April 1977 – 2 April 1981 & since 22 February 2001 ) :
 "SPMP" which is either
  Knight Grand Commander of the Order of the Crown of Perlis or Star of Safi (SPMP) with title Dato' Seri
 or see Perak

State of Malacca 

 Abang Muhammad Salahuddin ( 3rd & 6th List of Yang di-Pertua Negeri of Sarawak 2 April 1977 – 2 April 1981 & since 22 February 2001 ) :
  Grand Commander of the Premier and Exalted Order of Malacca (DUNM)  with title Datuk Seri Utama

State of Penang 

 Abang Muhammad Salahuddin ( 3rd & 6th List of Yang di-Pertua Negeri of Sarawak 2 April 1977 – 2 April 1981 & since 22 February 2001 ) :
  Knight Grand Commander of the Order of the Defender of State (DUPN)  with title Dato’ Seri Utama

State of Sabah 

 Abang Muhammad Salahuddin ( 3rd & 6th List of Yang di-Pertua Negeri of Sarawak 2 April 1977 – 2 April 1981 & since 22 February 2001 ) :
  Grand Commander of the Order of Kinabalu (SPDK) with title Datuk Seri Panglima

Asian honours

Far East  

To be completed if any ...

Middle East   

To be completed if any ...

American  honours 

To be completed if any ...

European honours 

To be completed if any ...

African honours 

To be completed if any ...

References

Notes 

 
Sarawak